Pittosporum gatopense is a species of plant in the Pittosporaceae family. It is endemic to New Caledonia.

References

gatopense
Endemic flora of New Caledonia
Endangered flora of Oceania
Taxonomy articles created by Polbot